Unity Health Toronto is a Catholic hospital network serving Toronto, Ontario, Canada. It was initially founded in 2017 under the provisional name Our Shared Purpose through the merger of St. Michael's Hospital, Providence Healthcare and St. Joseph's Health Centre. It is the largest Catholic health care network in Canada. All three facilities in the network are members of the Catholic Health Sponsors of Ontario and the CHSO is responsible for ensuring consistency with the founding principles of the Sisters of St. Joseph. Tim Rutledge is the CEO.

In the 2019-2020 fiscal year, there were nearly 46,000 inpatient stays across the 3 constituent hospitals and over 173,000 emergency department visits. The average length of inpatient stays was 6.3 days.

Constituent hospitals

Providence Healthcare

Providence Healthcare (founded 1857 as the House of Providence) is a 245-bed rehabilitation hospital located in the Scarborough district of Toronto. It also provides long-term care and palliative care for the elderly.

St. Joseph's Health Centre

St. Joseph's Health Centre (founded 1921) is a 376-bed general hospital in western Toronto.

St. Michael's Hospital

St. Michael's Hospital (founded 1892) is a 463-bed teaching hospital in the Garden District of downtown Toronto that is fully affiliated with the University of Toronto Faculty of Medicine. It is one of two level 1 adult trauma centres in the Greater Toronto Area, and is equipped with a helipad for air ambulance services.

References

Links

Hospitals in Toronto
Hospitals established in 2017
Hospital networks in Canada
Hospitals affiliated with the University of Toronto
2017 establishments in Ontario
Catholic hospitals in North America